Kirk Hilton (born 2 April 1981) is an English former professional footballer who played in the Football League for Blackpool.

Club career 
Hilton began his career in the Manchester United youth programme. He was released from United and played for clubs such as Altrincham and Blackpool, before being last seen playing as a defender for Royal Antwerp.

After football
Hilton retired aged 28 after a hip operation. He later moved to Dubai and founded a football academy.

References

External links 
 
 Profile – FC Antwerp

1981 births
Living people
English footballers
Association football defenders
Manchester United F.C. players
Royal Antwerp F.C. players
Livingston F.C. players
Blackpool F.C. players
Halifax Town A.F.C. players
Altrincham F.C. players
English expatriate footballers
Expatriate footballers in Belgium
People from Flixton, Greater Manchester
Footballers from Greater Manchester